John "Trapper" Wilson (born 22 October 1941 in Glasgow, Scotland) is a former motorcycle speedway rider in National League (speedway).

Biography
John graduated to Speedway from Grasstrack racing. After some brief appearances with Sunderland Stars in 1971, he rode for the Glasgow Tigers speedway team from 1971 to 1977 (Relocated as Coatbridge Tigers from 1974) and appeared for the Scotland national team from 1973 through to 1975. 
John also rode in four indoor Ice speedway events in Scotland during 1972 including the first event at Murrayfield riding for "Ayr Giants" against "Murrayfield" and the Scottish Open Pairs event in Aviemore, riding for Wembley Lions with partner Bert Harkins. John  rode three Long Track Speedway events at Motherwell finishing with a respectable 8 points in the opening event.

Post Speedway 
Upon Johns retirement from his Speedway career, he has continued riding competitive off-road motorcycling in various forms (including a return to Grasstrack), has encouraged the third generation of Wilson motorcyclists in his three sons John, Barry and Mark, the fourth generation of Wilson motorcyclists in his four grand children Rhys, Max, Holly and Astrid, has had a successful career as a Chartered professional Mechanical Engineer and currently enjoys retirement with his wife Chris in the Province of Valencia in Spain.

References

 "Speedway in Scotland", ( Jim Henry & Ian Moultray)
 Ivan Mauger's " Speedway Extravanza", ( Ivan Mauger & Peter Oakes)

External links
 http://www.defunctspeedway.co.uk/Coatbridge%20Speedway.htm
 http://www.defunctspeedway.co.uk/Barrow.htm
 https://web.archive.org/web/20140801192755/http://glasgowspeedway.com/menu/rollcall.html

1941 births
British speedway riders
Scottish speedway riders
Scottish motorcycle racers
Sunderland Stars riders
Glasgow Tigers riders
Berwick Bandits riders
Living people